The 1965–66 St. Francis Terriers men's basketball team represented St. Francis College during the 1965–66 NCAA men's basketball season. The team was coached by Daniel Lynch, who was in his eighteenth year at the helm of the St. Francis Terriers. The Terriers played their homes games at the 69th Regiment Armory. This is the team's first year in the newly organized Metropolitan Collegiate Conference.

The Terriers finished the season at 5–17 overall and 0–9 in conference play.

Roster

Schedule and results

|-
!colspan=12 style="background:#0038A8; border: 2px solid #CE1126;;color:#FFFFFF;"| Regular Season

References

St. Francis Brooklyn Terriers men's basketball seasons
St. Francis
Saint Francis
Saint Francis